Tage Wissnell (27 July 1905 – 13 May 1984) was a Swedish swimmer and footballer. He competed in the men's 200 metre breaststroke event at the 1928 Summer Olympics.

References

External links
 

1905 births
1984 deaths
Swedish footballers
Olympic swimmers of Sweden
Swimmers at the 1928 Summer Olympics
Swimmers from Stockholm
Djurgårdens IF Fotboll players
Association footballers not categorized by position
Swedish male breaststroke swimmers